F39 may refer to:

 Avia F.39, a bomber aircraft of the Czechoslovakian Air Force
 BMW X2 (F39), an automobile
 , a Brahmaputra-class guided missile frigate of the Indian Navy
 , a Leander-class frigate of the Royal Navy
 F-39, Brazilian designation for the Saab JAS 39 Gripen
 F39, an Egyptian hieroglyph